The Men's 30 kilometre pursuit cross-country skiing competition at the 2006 Winter Olympics in Turin, Italy, was held on 12 February at Pragelato.

Summary
The pursuit in this format had been skied three times at the Nordic skiing World Championships, and Frenchman Vincent Vittoz was the reigning World Champion. A pursuit event similar to this was skied at the 2002 Winter Olympics, where the gold was shared between Thomas Alsgaard (retired by 2006) and Frode Estil, but the 2002 event 2002 event was a 20 kilometre pursuit, not 30.

The event opened dramatically as Estil fell at the start, causing a mass collision. Then the pack kept together almost until the end, with skiers continually trailing off as they could not keep up with the pace. Eventually, five men came into the finishing straight together, after Anders Södergren of Sweden had tried to pull away on the final lap. However, Södergren could not keep up with the pace, and Russian Yevgeny Dementyev pulled away to defeat Estil and win Russia's first gold medal of the Games.

Results
The pursuit consisted of a 15 kilometre section raced in the classical style, followed by a 15 kilometre portion raced freestyle. In between the sections, each skier took time (approximately 30 seconds) to 'pit', changing their skis. Martin Tauber, an Austrian skier, originally placed 17th, but was disqualified after the IOC declared him permanently ineligible for doping-related violations.

The race was started at 13:45.

References

Men's cross-country skiing at the 2006 Winter Olympics
Men's pursuit cross-country skiing at the Winter Olympics